The 1982 Masters Tournament was the 46th Masters Tournament, held April 8–11 at Augusta National Golf Club in Augusta, Georgia. Craig Stadler won his only major championship by defeating  Dan Pohl on the first hole of a sudden-death playoff.

Challenging weather conditions on Thursday and Friday led to the cut at 154 (+10), the highest since the cut was introduced in 1957 and still the highest through 2021, with the co-leaders, Stadler and Curtis Strange, at even par 144.

In the final round, Stadler shot a 33 on the front had a six-shot lead with seven holes to play. He bogeyed four of those holes, including a three-putt from twenty feet (6 m) on the 72nd green to force a playoff with Pohl; the playoff began and ended at the tenth hole. Pohl carded two rounds of 67 on the weekend after two rounds of 75. In the sudden-death playoff, Stadler made a routine par and won the Masters when Pohl missed his six-foot par attempt.

This was the final year that players were required to use Augusta National club caddies. The practice was previously employed at the other majors and some PGA Tour events well into the 1970s; the U.S. Open first allowed the players to use their own caddies in 1976. The policy change at Augusta National was announced by chairman Hord Hardin in November 1982.

It was the final Masters as a competitor for 1946 champion Herman Keiser, age 67, who withdrew in the first round.

Course

Field
1. Masters champions
Tommy Aaron, George Archer (8), Seve Ballesteros (3), Gay Brewer (8), Billy Casper, Charles Coody, Raymond Floyd (8,11,12), Doug Ford, Bob Goalby, Herman Keiser, Jack Nicklaus (2,3,4,8,9,10,12), Arnold Palmer, Gary Player (8), Sam Snead, Art Wall Jr., Tom Watson (3,8,11,12), Fuzzy Zoeller (10,11)

Jack Burke Jr., Jimmy Demaret, Ralph Guldahl, Claude Harmon, Ben Hogan, Cary Middlecoff, Byron Nelson, Henry Picard, and Gene Sarazen did not play.

The following categories only apply to Americans

2. U.S. Open champions (last five years)
Hubert Green (8,11), Hale Irwin (11,12), Andy North

3. The Open champions (last five years)
Bill Rogers (9,11,12)

4. PGA champions (last five years)
John Mahaffey (8,11), Larry Nelson (10,12), Lanny Wadkins (8,9,11)

5. 1981 U.S. Amateur semi-finalists
Nathaniel Crosby (6,a), Bob Lewis (7,a), Brian Lindley (a), Willie Wood (a)

6. Previous two U.S. Amateur and Amateur champions

Hal Sutton (7) forfeited his exemption by turning professional.

7. Members of the 1981 U.S. Walker Cup team
Frank Fuhrer III (a), Jim Holtgrieve (a), Jodie Mudd (a), Corey Pavin (a), Jay Sigel (a)

Ron Commans, Joey Rassett, and Dick von Tacky forfeited their exemptions by turning professional.

8. Top 24 players and ties from the 1981 Masters Tournament
John Cook (9), Ben Crenshaw (9,12), Bob Gilder (10), Peter Jacobsen, Tom Kite (10,11,12), Bruce Lietzke (10,11,12), Johnny Miller (11,12), Gil Morgan, Jerry Pate (11,12), Calvin Peete (9), Don Pooley, Jim Simons (11), Curtis Strange

9. Top 16 players and ties from the 1981 U.S. Open
George Burns, Frank Conner, Mark Hayes, Lon Hinkle, Chi-Chi Rodríguez, John Schroeder, Jim Thorpe

Sammy Rachels did not play

10. Top eight players and ties from 1981 PGA Championship
Keith Fergus (11), Dan Pohl

11. Winners of PGA Tour events since the previous Masters
Andy Bean, Danny Edwards, Dave Eichelberger, Ed Fiori, Jay Haas, Morris Hatalsky, Wayne Levi, Jack Renner , J. C. Snead, Craig Stadler, Ron Streck, Lee Trevino (12), Tom Weiskopf

12. Members of the U.S. 1981 Ryder Cup team

13. Foreign invitations
Isao Aoki (9,10), Dave Barr (11), David Graham (2,4,8,9), Yutaka Hagawa, Bernhard Langer, Greg Norman (8,10), Peter Oosterhuis (11), Philippe Ploujoux (6,a)

Numbers in brackets indicate categories that the player would have qualified under had they been American.

Round summaries

First round
Thursday, April 8, 1982

Source:

Second round
Friday, April 9, 1982

Source:

Third round
Saturday, April 10, 1982

Source:

Final round
Sunday, April 11, 1982

Final leaderboard

Sources:

Scorecard

Cumulative tournament scores, relative to par
Source:

Playoff 

Sudden-death playoff began and ended on hole #10, when Stadler parred to win.

References

External links
Masters.com – past winners and results
Augusta.com – 1982 Masters leaderboard and scorecards

1982
1982 in golf
1982 in American sports
1982 in sports in Georgia (U.S. state)
April 1982 sports events in the United States